Satnica Đakovačka is a municipality in Osijek-Baranja County, Croatia. There are 2,123 inhabitants, 99% of whom are Croats (2011 census).

References

Municipalities of Croatia